Anne-Marie Pauline Brunius (24 September 1916 – 10 November 2002) was a Swedish film actress. She was born in Stockholm, and died in Åkersberga, Sweden.

Daughter of actors John W. Brunius and Pauline Brunius.

Selected filmography
Herr Vinners stenåldersdröm (1924)
Karl XII del II (1925)
The Doctor's Secret (1930)
 The Two of Us (1930)
 Servant's Entrance (1932)
Farmors revolution (1933)
Djurgårdsnätter (1933)
 Fired (1934)
Unga hjärtan (1934)
Ungdom av idag (1935)
 Adventure in Pyjamas (1935)
 The Wedding Trip (1936)
Girl with Hyacinths (1950)
The Birds and the Bees (1956)

External links

1916 births
2002 deaths
Swedish film actresses
Actresses from Stockholm